Alfred Levitt (August 15, 1894 - May 25, 2000), born Avraham Levitt in Starodub, Russia, was a painter and an expert on prehistoric art who migrated to the U.S. in 1911 and was made a Chevalier of the Order of the Arts and Letters by the government of France for his studies of paleolithic cave paintings.

Levitt was an anarchist whose friends included radicals Emma Goldman and Jack London as well as artist Marcel Duchamp.

Twenty of his works are in the collection of the Metropolitan Museum of Art in New York City. He was also a MacDowell Colony Fellow in 1956. His papers are now in the Smithsonian Institution's Archives of American Art.

References

Further reading

 

1894 births
2000 deaths
American anarchists
American centenarians
Men centenarians
Jewish American artists
Russian anarchists
Russian centenarians
Emigrants from the Russian Empire to the United States